Gabriel Rodrigo Ribeiro Tavares Bernardino (born 1964) is a Portuguese mathematician who has been serving as the Chairman of the European Insurance and Occupational Pensions Authority (EIOPA) from 2011 to 2021.

Early life and education
Bernardino was born in Bombarral, a village north of Lisbon. His father was a farmer. He holds degrees in mathematics and statistics from the Universidade Nova de Lisboa.

Career
During Portugal's presidency of the Council of the European Union in 2007, Bernardino chaired the initial Council working group responsible for negotiating the Solvency II directive and the Accounting Expert Group. From 2009 to early 2011, he served as Chairman of the managing board of the Committee of European Insurance and Occupational Pensions Supervisors (CEIOPS), EIOPA's predecessor.

Bernardino took up the post of chairman of the newly created European Insurance and Occupational Pensions Authority on 1 March 2011, for a first five-year term. His nomination followed a pre-selection of the European Commission and was confirmed by the European Parliament after a public hearing on 1 February 2011. On 16 December 2015, the European Parliament reelected Bernardino for a second five-year term, which started on 1 March 2016 and ended in February 2021. As Chairman of EIOPA, he was responsible for the strategic direction of the financial regulatory authority.

Other activities
 European Systemic Risk Board (ESRB), Second Vice-Chair

References 

1964 births
Living people
People from Leiria District
20th-century Portuguese mathematicians
21st-century Portuguese mathematicians